Davide Moretti (born March 25, 1998) is an Italian professional basketball player for Victoria Libertas Pesaro of the Lega Basket Serie A (LBA) on a loan contract from Olimpia Milano. He played college basketball for the Texas Tech Red Raiders.

Early life and career
In addition to basketball, Moretti grew up in Bologna, Italy playing soccer, tennis, and volleyball. In the 2013–14 season, he played for prominent Italian amateur club Stella Azzurra. In 2013, Moretti joined Stella Azzurra at the Città di Roma regional tournament for the Euroleague Basketball Next Generation Tournament. On July 9, 2014, he signed with Lega Basket Serie A (LBA) club Pistoia Basket 2000, where his father Paolo Moretti was head coach. Through 12 games, Moretti averaged 1.3 points in 6.9 minutes per game. For the next two seasons, he joined Universo Treviso Basket of the Serie A2 Basket. In the 2016–17 season, Moretti was named the best under-22 player in the Serie A2 after averaging 12.6 points, 2.3 assists, and 0.9 steals per game.

College career
Moretti took his father's advice to improve as a basketball player through college basketball. On June 12, 2017, he signed an Athletic Scholarship Agreement to play for Texas Tech in the NCAA Division I. Moretti was drawn to the program in part because head coach Chris Beard had experience coaching the Swiss national team and was familiar with European styles of play. He chose Texas Tech over UConn, Indiana, and Utah. Moretti mainly came off the bench in his freshman season, averaging 3.5 points, 1.1 assists and 0.8 rebounds per game. He was named to the 2018 All-Big 12 Conference Academic Rookie Team.

Moretti became a regular starter as a sophomore. On January 26, 2019, he scored a career-high 21 points in a 67–64 win over Arkansas. By the end of the regular season, he was shooting 92.2 percent on free throws, which ranked second in the NCAA Division I. Moretti won the Elite 90 Award for academic excellence and earned third-team All-Big 12 recognition. He averaged 11.5 points, 2.4 assists, and 1.1 steals per game. Coming into his junior season, Moretti was named to the Bob Cousy Award Watch List. He was named Honorable Mention All-Big 12. As a junior, Moretti averaged 13 points, 2.3 assists, 1.7 rebounds and 1.2 steals per game and started all 31 games. On May 23, 2020, he decided to forego his senior season at Texas Tech to pursue a professional career in Europe, signing with agent Miško Raznatović of BeoBasket.

Professional career
On May 26, 2020, Moretti signed a multi-year contract with Olimpia Milano of the Lega Basket Serie A and the EuroLeague.

In the season 2021–22, he plays on a loan contract for V.L. Pesaro.

National team career
Moretti has often represented Italy in FIBA junior tournaments. He averaged 10.4 points per game at the 2014 FIBA Under-17 World Championship in Dubai, leading the Italian national under-17 team to ninth place. Moretti guided the Italian under-19 team to a bronze medal at the 2016 FIBA Europe Under-18 Championship in Samsun, after averaging 14.8 points and five assists per game.

Career statistics

College

|-
| style="text-align:left;"| 2017–18
| style="text-align:left;"| Texas Tech
| 37 || 1 || 12.3 || .336 || .317 || .857 || .8 || 1.1 || .4 || .0 || 3.5
|-
| style="text-align:left;"| 2018–19
| style="text-align:left;"| Texas Tech
| 38 || 38 || 31.6 || .498 || .459 || style="background:#cfecec;"| .924* || 2.1 || 2.4 || 1.1 || .0 || 11.5
|-
| style="text-align:left;"| 2019–20
| style="text-align:left;"| Texas Tech
| 31 || 31 || 34.1 || .419 || .383 || .902 || 1.7 || 2.3 || 1.2 || .0 || 13.0
|- class="sortbottom"
| style="text-align:center;" colspan="2"| Career
| 106 || 70 || 25.6 || .436 || .399 || .906 || 1.5 || 1.9 || .9 || .0 || 9.1

Personal life
Moretti is the son of Paolo Moretti, who had a 15-year professional career in Europe and won a silver medal with the Italian national team at EuroBasket 1997. After retiring from playing during Davide's childhood, Paolo began coaching professionally and won the LBA Coach of the Year award with Pistoia in 2014. Moretti has a younger brother Niccolò, who plays basketball in Italy at the junior level.

Footnotes

References

External links
Texas Tech Red Raiders bio

1998 births
Living people
Italian expatriate basketball people in the United States
Italian men's basketball players
Lega Basket Serie A players
Olimpia Milano players
Pistoia Basket 2000 players
Point guards
Sportspeople from Bologna
Texas Tech Red Raiders basketball players
Universo Treviso Basket players
Victoria Libertas Pallacanestro players